Richter tuning is a system of choosing the reeds for a diatonic wind instrument (such as a harmonica or accordion). It is named after Joseph Richter, a Bohemian instrument maker who adopted the tuning for his harmonicas in the early 19th century and is credited with inventing the blow/draw mechanism that allows the harmonica to play different notes when the air is drawn instead of blown. 

Richter tuning is designed as a compromise between diatonic melody and harmony. The lower portion of the harmonica is designed to play the tonic and dominant chords on the blow and draw respectively (in the key of C, this would be the C major and G major chords). The remainder of the instrument is tuned to, in this example, blow entirely in the key of C major, with each successive note following the sequence

C E G

and the four notes not in the C major chord arranged on the draw in the sequence

D F A B.

For example:

{| class="wikitable" style="text-align:center"
! hole
||  1 ||  2 ||  3 ||  4 ||  5 ||  6 ||  7 ||  8 ||  9 || 10 || 11 || 12 || 13 || 14 || 15 || 16
|-
! blow note
|| G || C || E || G || C || E || G || C || E || G || C || E || G || C || E || G
|-
! draw note
|| B || D  || G || B || D || F || A || B || D || F || A || B || D || F || A || B
|}

The above diagram shows that Richter tuning has some missing notes, notably A and F are absent from the lowest octave (draw notes in holes 3 and 4).  By comparison, solo tuning includes all the major scale notes (C D E F G A B C) for all octaves.

Variants 

There have been many variants of Richter tuning.

Country tuning 

Country tuning raises the initial F by a semitone to an F. This primarily aids in harmony in the key of G, facilitating easy play of the G-C-D (I-IV-V) chord progression, while maintaining a partial G7 (minus the root) higher on the harmonica. It can occasionally be helpful in some melodies, most notably "The Star-Spangled Banner," which has a low F# and a high F.  For example:

{| class="wikitable" style="text-align:center"
! hole
||  1 ||  2 ||  3 ||  4 ||  5 ||  6 ||  7 ||  8 ||  9 || 10
|-
! blow note
|| C || E || G || C || E || G || C || E || G  || C 
|-
! draw note
|| D  || G || B || D || F || A || B || D || F || A
|}

(Compare this to major seventh tuning, below.)

Harmonic minor tuning 
Harmonic minor tuning is a variation in which E is replaced by E and A is replaced by A.  Thus the blow notes repeat a sequence of
C E G
(perhaps shifted to begin with E or with G) and draw notes at some point begin to follow a repeating sequence of
D F A B
though perhaps with a different initial sequence.

For example:

{| class="wikitable" style="text-align:center"
! hole
||  1 ||  2 ||  3 ||  4 ||  5 ||  6 ||  7 ||  8 ||  9 || 10 || 11 || 12 || 13 || 14 || 15 || 16
|-
! blow note
|| G || C || E || G || C || E || G || C || E || G || C || E || G || C || E || G
|-
! draw note
|| B || D  || G || B || D || F || A || B || D || F || A || B || D || F || A || B
|}

Major seventh tuning 

Major seventh tuning raised each F by a semitone to F♯.  For example

{| class="wikitable" style="text-align:center"
! hole
||  1 ||  2 ||  3 ||  4 ||  5 ||  6 ||  7 ||  8 ||  9 || 10 || 11 || 12 || 13 || 14 || 15 || 16
|-
! blow note
|| G || C || E || G || C || E || G || C || E || G || C || E || G || C || E || G
|-
! draw note
|| B || D  || G || B || D || F || A || B || D || F || A || B || D || F || A || B
|}

(Compare this to country tuning, above.)

Melody Maker™ tuning* 

Melody Maker™ tuning* raises the third Blow (Exhale) note by a full note, and raises the #5 Draw by a semitone to F.  For example:

{| class="wikitable" style="text-align:center"
! hole
||  1 ||  2 ||  3 ||  4 ||  5 ||  6 ||  7 ||  8 ||  9 || 10
|-
! blow note
|| C || E || A || C || E || G || C || E || G || C
|-
! draw note
|| D || G  || B || D || F# || A || B || D || F# || A
|}

Note: the Melody Maker™ tuning is key labeled from the Draw (Inhale) Second Position.
The example above shows a Melody Maker™ in the Key of G.
The Melody Maker™ tuning was developed by Lee Oskar Harmonicas in the early 1980s.

Natural minor tuning 

Natural minor tuning is a variation in which E is replaced by E and B is replaced by B.  Thus the blow notes repeat a sequence of
C E G
(perhaps shifted to begin with E or with G) and draw notes at some point begin to follow a repeating sequence of
D F A B
though perhaps with a different initial sequence.

For example:

{| class="wikitable" style="text-align:center"
! hole
||  1 ||  2 ||  3 ||  4 ||  5 ||  6 ||  7 ||  8 ||  9 || 10 || 11 || 12 || 13 || 14 || 15 || 16
|-
! blow note
|| G || C || E || G || C || E || G || C || E || G || C || E || G || C || E || G
|-
! draw note
|| B || D  || G || B || D || F || A || B || D || F || A || B || D || F || A || B
|}

Paddy Richter tuning 

Paddy Richter tuning (developed by Brendan Power) allows a two octave scale suitable for melody-based music. It was developed with Irish jigs, reels and hornpipes in mind but is suitable for other melodic music also; it allows pentatonic scales in the stated key and up a fifth; for instance, an instrument in the key of G can play both the G and D major pentatonic scales throughout the length of the instrument). The tuning raises the 3 blow by a whole step e.g. from D to E on a G harp; this addition of the sixth also allows melodies on a harmonica's corresponding minor scale (e.g. E minor on a G harmonica) to be played an octave lower than would otherwise be possible without bending. The addition of this, however, adds an additional complication to playing harmonic music on the harmonica, requiring the 3 hole to be blocked when playing a tonic chord. The lower octave requires a bend on the 2 draw to achieve a missing note (on a G harmonica, a C when playing in G, or a C# when playing in D), which is also required on standard Richter-tuned harmonicas.

For example:

{| class="wikitable" style="text-align:center"
! hole
||  1 ||  2 ||  3 ||  4 ||  5 ||  6 ||  7 ||  8 ||  9 || 10
|-
! blow note
|| G || B || E || G || B || D || G || B || D || G 
|-
! draw note
|| A || D  || F# || A || C || E || F# || A || C || E
|}

(above Paddy Richter tuning was checked on a Paddy Richter G Harp using an electronic Chromatic Tuner)

Richter Extended tuning 

So-called Richter Extended tuning is in fact a significant departure from Richter tuning. In "Richter extended tuning," all Fs and As are removed from the instrument, and the dominant (G) chord is, like C on the blow, extended through all of the holes on the draw, following the sequence

D G B.

For example:

{| class="wikitable" style="text-align:center"
! hole
||  1 ||  2 ||  3 ||  4 ||  5 ||  6 ||  7 ||  8 ||  9 || 10 || 11 || 12
|-
! blow note
|| C || E || G || C || E || G || C || E || G || C || E || G 
|-
! draw note
|| D || G  || B || D || G  || B || D || G  || B || D || G  || B 
|}

See also 
Augmented tuning
Diminished tuning
Dorian Cross tuning
Scale tuning
Solo tuning

References 
 Chelminski, Rudolph; “Harmonicas are… hooty, wheezy, twangy and tooty”, Smithsonian Magazine, November 1995.
 Häffner, Martin, and Lars Lindenmüller; Harmonica Makers of Germany and Austria: History and Trademarks of Hohner and Their Many Competitors.

Musical tuning